Diversidoris aurantionodulosa is a species of sea slug or dorid nudibranch, a marine gastropod mollusk in the family Chromodorididae.

Distribution 
The type locality for this species is Dar Es Salaam, Tanzania. Additional material from Hong Kong and Australia was included in the original description.

Description

Ecology

References

Chromodorididae
Gastropods described in 1987